Gatto is a surname. Notable people with the surname include:

 Anthony Gatto, American juggler
 Eddie Gatto (1916–1944), American football player
 Emanuele Gatto, Italian footballer
 Joe Gatto (artist) (1893–1965), American artist
 Joe Gatto (comedian) (born 1976), American comedian
 John Taylor Gatto (1935-2018), American educator, writer, and activist
 Mike Gatto (born 1974), American politician
 Oscar Gatto (born 1985), Italian cyclist

See also
 GATTO, a genetic algorithm for automatic test pattern generation for the testing of Very-large-scale integration (VLSI) circuits
Surnames from nicknames